The Karabakh Khanate was a semi-independent Turkic Caucasian khanate on the territories of modern-day Armenia and Azerbaijan established in about 1748 under Iranian suzerainty in Karabakh and adjacent areas.

The Karabakh Khanate came under the control of the Russian Empire in 1805 during the course of the Russo-Persian War (1804–13). The Russian annexation of Karabakh was not formalized until the Treaty of Gulistan in 1813, when Fath-Ali Shah of Qajar Iran officially ceded Karabakh to Tsar Alexander I of Russia. The khanate continued to exist under Russian suzerainty until its formal abolition in 1822, when the Karabakh Province, with a military administration, was formed. Russian control was decisively confirmed by the Treaty of Turkmenchay with Iran in 1828.

History

Background 
The precursor of the Karabakh Khanate, the Safavid province of Karabakh, was one of the provinces established in the northern part of the Safavid Empire. The Safavid shah of Iran Tahmasp I granted the governance of the province to a branch of the Qajars, the Ziyadoglu, in 1540. It was initially founded in the lowland part of Karabakh ("Karabakh Steppe"), away from the mountainous regions, known today as Nagorno-Karabakh and Syunik. The mountainous part of Karabakh was also home to several semi-autonomous Armenian principalities known as the Khamsa Melikdoms. According to a prominent historian who hailed from the Karabakh Khanate, Mirza Adigozal Bey, "The power of the Karabakh beylerbeylik covered a vast territory – from the Georgian border near “Sinig Korpu” Bridge (currently "Red Bridge”) to Khudafarin Bridge on the Araz River. However, following the collapse of the Safavid Empire and the death of Nader Shah Afshar in 1747, the Safavid domain split into several khanates with various forms of autonomy.

Establishment 
After the death of Nader Shah and the fragmentation of the Safavid Empire, Panah Ali khan of the Javanshir clan consolidated his local power by establishing a de facto independent khanate. The Javanshir clan lived as nomads in Karabakh and had long been rivals of the Ziyadoglu. Panah Ali was recognized as Khan of Karabakh by Nader Shah's successor Adel Shah.

The capital of the khanate was initially Bayat Castle in modern-day Kabirli in 1748, in the Karabakh Steppe (or “Lowland Karabakh”), before being moved to the newly built fortress of Shahbulag and soon moved again to the newly built fortress-town of Panahabad (modern-day Shusha) in 1750–1752. Panah Ali acquired this fortress in the heart of Mountainous Karabakh through his alliance with Melik Shahnazar II, the ruler of Varanda, who was in conflict with the other meliks of Karabakh. Melik Shahnazar and Panah Ali Khan solidified their alliance with the marriage of Shahnazar's daughter to Panah Ali's son, Ibrahim Khalil. During the reign of Ibrahim Khalil, Panahabad became a large town and was renamed to Shusha, apparently after the name of a nearby Shusha, known also as Shushikent.

Later, Panah Ali Khan expanded the territory of the khanate, subjugating territories of Mountainous Karabakh, Zangezur, and Nakchivan Khanate.

Reign of Panah Ali Khan Javanshir 

Less than a year after Shusha was founded, the Karabakh Khanate was attacked by Mohammad Hasan Khan Qajar, one of the major claimants to the Iranian throne. During Safavid rule, Karabakh had been governed by the Turkic Qajar clan for almost two centuries, as they were appointed governors of the Ganja-Karabakh province. For this reason, Mohammed Hasan Khan Qajar considered Karabakh his hereditary estate.

Mohammad Hasan Khan besieged Panahabad but soon had to retreat because of the attack on his own domain by one of his major opponents in the struggle for the Iranian throne, Karim Khan Zand. His retreat was so hasty that he even left his cannons under the walls of Shusha fortress. Panah Ali Khan counterattacked the retreating troops of Mohammad Hasan Khan and even briefly took Ardabil across the Aras River in Azerbaijan.

In 1759, the Karabakh Khanate underwent a new attack from Fath-Ali Khan Afshar, ruler of the Urmia Khanate. With his 30,000-strong army, Fath-Ali Khan also managed to gain support from the meliks of Jraberd and Talysh (Gulistan); however, Melik Shahnazar of Varanda continued to support Panah Ali Khan. The siege of Shusha lasted for six months and Fath-Ali Khan eventually had to retreat. Panah Ali gave his son Ibrahim as a hostage to Fath-Ali Khan to end the siege.

In 1761, Karim Khan Zand allied with Panah Ali Khan of Karabakh to defeat Fath-Ali Khan Afshar of Urmia, who had earlier subordinated the khanates of Karabakh, Marageh, and Tabriz.

In 1762, during his war with Kazem Khan of Qaradagh, Panah Khan submitted to Karim Khan Zand, who was consolidating different khans under his rule and was about to besiege Urmia. After the fall of the city, Karim took Panah Khan among the hostages to Shiraz, where he soon died. Panah Ali Khan's son Ibrahim Khalil Khan was sent back to Karabakh as governor.

Reign of Ibrahim Khalil Khan Javanshir 
Under Ibrahim Khalil Khan Javanshir, the Karabakh Khanate became one of the strongest entities of the South Caucasus and Shusha turned into a big town. According to travelers who visited Shusha in the late 18th and early 19th centuries, the town had about 2,000 houses and an approximate population of 10,000.

In the summer of 1795, Shusha was besieged by Agha Mohammad Khan Qajar, son of Mohammad Hasan Khan, who attacked Shusha in 1752. Agha Mohammad Khan Qajar's goal was to end the feudal fragmentation and restore the old Safavid imperial domain. For this purpose, he also wanted to proclaim himself shah (king) of Iran. However, according to Safavid tradition, the shah had to control the South Caucasus and southern Dagestan before his coronation. Therefore, the Karabakh Khanate and its fortified capital Shusha were the first and major obstacle to achieve these ends.

Agha Mohammad Khan Qajar besieged Shusha with his 80,000-strong army. Ibrahim Khalil Khan mobilized the population for long-term defense. The a militia 15,000 was assembled in Shusha, where women fought alongside men. The Armenian population of Karabakh also actively participated in this struggle against the invaders and fought side by side with the Muslim population, jointly organizing ambushes in the mountains and forests.

The siege lasted for 33 days. Not being able to capture Shusha, Agha Mohammad Khan ceased the siege and advanced to Tiflis (present-day Tbilisi), which, despite desperate resistance, was occupied and exposed to unprecedented destruction, with many thousands of its inhabitants carried off to mainland Iran.

Qajar period 

In 1797, Agha Mohammad Khan Qajar, who by that time had already managed to declare himself Shah, and had swiftly either re-occupied or re-subjugated the entire Caucasus that previously made up part of Iran for centuries, decided now to carry out a second attack on Karabakh, as its khan was not letting him nor his armies enter the city. Nevertheless, the khan of Karabakh had already been paying regular tribute to Agha Mohammad Khan since the aftermath of the first attack in 1795.

In this new siege, Agha Mohammad Khan devastated the surrounding villages near Shusha. The population could not recover from the previous 1795 attack and also suffered from a serious drought which lasted for three years. The artillery of the enemy also caused serious losses to the city defenders. Thus, in 1797 Aga Mohammad Khan succeeded in seizing Shusha and Ibrahim Khalil Khan was forced to flee to Dagestan.

However, several days after the seizure of Shusha, Agha Mohammad Khan was killed in enigmatic circumstances by his bodyguards. Ibrahim Khalil Khan returned Agha Mohammad Shah's body to Tehran, and in return, the new king Fath-Ali Shah Qajar appointed him the governor of Karabakh and married his daughter Agha Beyim. Agha Baji, as she came to be called, was brought to court accompanied by her brother Abol' Fath Khan, and became Fath' Ali Shah's twelfth wife; highly respected at the court, for some reason she remained a virgin.

Conquest by Russia 

During the rule of Ibrahim Khalil Khan, the Karabakh Khanate grew in importance and established ties with other neighbouring khanates. On May 14, 1805, amidst the still ongoing Russo-Persian War of 1804–1813, Ibrahim Khalil Khan and the Russian general Pavel Tsitsianov signed the Treaty of Kurekchay, which transferred the Karabakh Khanate to the dominion of the Russian Empire. According to this agreement, the Khan of Karabakh gave up his right to carry out independent foreign policy, and took on the obligation to pay 8,000 gold rubles a year to the Russian treasury. In its turn, the Tsarist government promised not to infringe upon the right of Ibrahim Khan's legitimate successors to administer the internal affairs of their possessions.

However, in the same year, Russians reneged on the agreement, apparently acting on suspicion that Ibrahim Khalil Panah Khan was a traitor. He was killed near Shusha together with some members of his family by Major Dmitri Tikhonovich Lisanevich.

The Russian Empire finally gained control over Karabakh through the Treaty of Gulistan (1813) and Treaty of Turkmenchay (1828) after defeating Iran in the Russo-Persian Wars.

In 1822, Russian Empire abolished the khanate. A Karabakh province was created in its place, administered by Russian officials.

Legacy 

Some of the descendants of Panah Khan subsequently scattered around Iran with most remaining in Karabakh. Abdul Wakil Panah Khan became the Emir of Greater Khorasan.

Abul-Fath Khan Javanshir, was one of the sons of Ibrahim Khalil Javanshir, that through his sister was the brother-in-law of Fath-Alī Shah Qajar. In the First Russo-Persian War Abul-Fath Khan supported the Iranians and fought on the side of the crown prince Abbas Mirza. After Karabakh was ceded to Russia and even before it, Abul-Fath Khan withdrew from Karabakh along with his fellow tribesmen, and Abbās Mirza made him governor of Dezmār. Dezamār lay on a southern tributary of the Aras, which flowed into the main river at Ordubad. In the years following 1813 Abul-Fath Khan smuggled his warriors back across the Aras into southern Karabakh and took up residence in the village of Garmī (eight farsangs south of Shusha). Presumably, this must have been done with the connivance of his brother Mahdiqoli Khan Javanshir, who had succeeded his father in 1806 as governor of Shusha in the service of the Russians. In 1818, long before the outbreak of the Second Russo-Persian War, Abbas Mirza invaded the territory to which the Russians laid claim and which was de facto under their sovereignty; supported by 100 horsemen, he brought Abul-Fath Khan back by force. What happened to Abul-Fath Khan thereafter is not known; he does not appear to have taken part in the battles of the Second Russo-Persian War. His brother Mahdī-qolī Khan crossed into Iranian soil in 1822. Under the terms of the Treaty of Turkmanchay in 1828, the whole of Karabakh was finally ceded to Russia.

Army
Karabakh Khanate never had a permanent army, but those who were a certain age and had the ability to serve in the military were written in a special register. When it was necessary, soldiers were called together with local landlords, meliks and beks. The persons whose names were included in the register with along with volunteers formed the army of the Karabakh Khanate, but they were deployed only in cases of war or emergency. Sometimes, especially in urgent circumstances, soldiers from Dagestan were invited to join the army of the Karabakh Khanate. For example, when Agha Muhammad Khan Qajar seized Shusha for 33 days, part of the soldiers who were defending Shusha were from Dagestan. During the rule of Ibrahim Khalil Khan, the Army Register contained more than 12,000 names. All expenses of the army during the campaign were paid by Ibrahim Khan.

Rulers 
The following is a list of the Khanate's rulers, all from the Javanshir clan.

See also
 Khanates of the Caucasus
Melikdoms of Karabakh
Nagorno-Karabakh conflict

Sources 
 Abbasqulu Bakihanov, Gulistan-i-Iram, 1841 (Baku, Elm, 1991)
 Mirza Karabaghi, Karabakh-name

References

External links
  Kurekchay Treaty between the Karabakh khanate and the Russian Empire

 
Karabakh
States and territories established in 1748
States and territories disestablished in 1822
States and territories established by the Afshar tribe